The Stringer Stone House, also known as the John B. Bayless House, was a historic stone mansion located at 224 Warren Avenue in Rayland, Ohio. The house was added to the National Register of Historic Places on July 10, 1974. It was destroyed by fire in 1982.

The house was built in 1836 by John Brown Bayless, an abolitionist from Maryland. The interior was decorated with murals by an Italian artist, including a waterfall beside the stairs, William Penn's treaty with the Indians, a castle in England, and a gristmill and mill workers. In 1860 it was purchased by Jefferson D. Stringer. Rutherford B. Hayes visited it in 1876, during his term as governor of Ohio.

Bayless constructed a three-and-a-half-story building out of gray sandstone.  Much about the design was unusual: he placed the main entrances on the second story, the stone chimneys on each end consisted of attached pairs, and the house faced away from the road.  The largest exception to the house's almost complete stone construction was a small wooden porch surrounding the front entrance; it was accessed by a set of stone steps.

The house was destroyed by a fire in 1982.  the site remained vacant.

References

Further reading
 Robert H. Richardson. A Time and Place in Ohio: A Chronological Account of Certain Historical and Genealogical Miscellany in Eastern Ohio. Smithtown, New York: Exposition, 1983. .

External links
 David Bernstein, Tour 8, section B – East Liverpool to Marietta (part 3), June 19, 2012: revisiting sites described in the Federal Writers' Project The Ohio Guide (1940)
 Photograph from 	Ohio Federal Writers' Project, at Ohio Guide
 National Register of Historic Places listings in Jefferson County, Ohio, at American Dreams

1982 fires in the United States
Burned houses in the United States
Buildings and structures demolished in 1982
Demolished buildings and structures in Ohio
Houses on the National Register of Historic Places in Ohio
Houses completed in 1836
Houses in Jefferson County, Ohio
National Register of Historic Places in Jefferson County, Ohio
Stone houses in Ohio